Elio Carlo Colosetti Drazich (born May 19, 1948) is a retired Argentine professional wrestler who is primarily known under the ring name Coloso Colosetti. Colosetti wrestled primarily in Mexico and Southern California, but also worked in Texas, Asia and Europe. Colosetti retired in the late 1990s.

Professional wrestling career
Carlos Elio Colosetti became a professional wrestler in his native Argentina before travelling through all South America, Central America and North to Mexico in order to work full time as a wrestler. In Mexico he often competed under the ring name Coloso Colosetti (Spanish for "Colossal Colosetti") and was a regular on Empresa Mexicana de Lucha Libre (EMLL) shows. On December 19, 1968, Colosetti's singles career peaked when he defeated Ray Mendoza to win the NWA World Light Heavyweight Championship, which at the time was considered the top ranked singles title in Mexico. His reign as the top champion lasted until March 20, 1970, when Ray Mendoza regained the championship. Later on Colosetti worked extensively in Southern California, primarily for the NWA Hollywood territory. While competing in NWA Hollywood Colosetti and Jonathan Boyd teamed up to win the NWA Americas Tag Team Championship from Hector Guerrero and Barry Orton on May 18, 1979, on a show in Los Angeles, California. The team only held the title for one day, losing it to a team known as The Twin Devils on the 19th. Colosetti remained active until the late 1990s, with his last national exposure being him losing a Lucha de Apuesta match to Perro Aguayo on June 26, 1991, and being forced to have his hair shaved off after the match per Lucha traditions.

Championships and accomplishments
Empresa Mexicana de la Lucha Libre
NWA World Light Heavyweight Championship (1 time)
NWA Los Angeles
NWA Americas Tag Team Championship (2 times) – with Jonathan Boyd and The Great Yamamoto (1)

Luchas de Apuestas record

References

1948 births
Argentine male professional wrestlers
Living people
Sportspeople from Buenos Aires
20th-century professional wrestlers
NWA World Light Heavyweight Champions